The luminous hake (Steindachneria argentea) is a West Atlantic member of the Merluccidae family. It is the only member of its genus.

Characteristics
They have a silver colored body with slight brown coloring in dorsal areas, a purple tint ventrally, and a dark oral cavity. They have big eyes on a large head and a tapering body that ends in a point since they have no caudal fin. Their luminosity comes from a characteristic striated light organ on the sides of the head and lower (ventral) half of the body. The anus is found between the pelvic fins and is widely separated from the urogenital opening located anterior to the anal fin.

Luminous hake have uninterrupted lateral lines. They have a combined total of 18-20 gill rakers with five on the upper limb and 13-15 on the lower limb. The front of the first of two dorsal fins is the location of its one spine. The one anal fin is made up of a total of 123-125 soft rays. They possess paired pectoral and pelvic fins. The pectoral fins have 14-17 soft rays. The pelvic fins are located in the thoracic region.

Distribution
Luminous hake are common in deep water but can be found on the outer shelf and on soft muddy bottoms of the Western Atlantic, Florida, northern Gulf of Mexico through Central America to Venezuela.  The luminous hake occur at a depth range of 400–500 meters.

Other information 
 This species is of no interest by fisheries.
 Merluccius albidus is a predator of luminous hake.

References

luminous hake
Fish of the Caribbean
Fish of the Gulf of Mexico
luminous hake